The 1936 football season was São Paulo's 7th season since the club's founding in 1930.

Statistics

Scorers

Overall

{|class="wikitable"
|-
|Games played || 34 (21 Campeonato Paulista, 13 Friendly match)
|-
|Games won || 11 (7 Campeonato Paulista, 4 Friendly match)
|-
|Games drawn || 7 (2 Campeonato Paulista, 5 Friendly match)
|-
|Games lost || 16 (12 Campeonato Paulista, 4 Friendly match)
|-
|Goals scored || 44
|-
|Goals conceded || 50
|-
|Goal difference || -6
|-
|Best result || 6–0 (H) v Paulista - Campeonato Paulista - 1937.01.03
|-
|Worst result || 1–5 (A) v Portuguesa Santista - Campeonato Paulista - 1936.08.16
|-
|Most appearances || 
|-
|Top scorer || Chemp (6)
|-

Friendlies

Official competitions

Campeonato Paulista

Record

External links
official website 

Association football clubs 1936 season
1936
1936 in Brazilian football